The 2011–12 St. John's Red Storm men's basketball team represented St. John's University during the 2011–12 NCAA Division I men's basketball season. The team was coached by Steve Lavin in his second year at the school. St. John's home games were played at Carnesecca Arena and Madison Square Garden and the team was a member of the Big East Conference.

Off season

Departures

Class of 2011 signees

Roster

Schedule

|-
!colspan=9 style="background:#FF0000; color:#FFFFFF;"| Exhibition

  
|-
!colspan=9 style="background:#FF0000; color:#FFFFFF;"| Non-Conference Regular Season

|-
!colspan=9 style="background:#FF0000; color:#FFFFFF;"| Big East Conference Regular Season

|-
!colspan=9 style="background:#FF0000; color:#FFFFFF;"| Big East tournament

Team players drafted into the NBA

See also
 2011–12 NCAA Division I men's basketball rankings

References

St. John's
St. John's Red Storm men's basketball seasons
St John
St John